Elliott Denman (born January 23, 1934) is an American racewalker. He competed in the men's 50 kilometres walk at the 1956 Summer Olympics.

At the 1961 Maccabiah Games in Israel, he won the 3,000 m racewalk.

References

External links
 

1934 births
Living people
Athletes (track and field) at the 1956 Summer Olympics
American male racewalkers
Olympic track and field athletes of the United States
Place of birth missing (living people)
Maccabiah Games gold medalists for the United States
Maccabiah Games medalists in athletics
Competitors at the 1961 Maccabiah Games